Ancylosis samaritanella is a species of snout moth in the genus Ancylosis. It was described by Zeller in 1867. It is found in Spain, Russia, Turkey, Jordan, the Canary Islands, Morocco, Algeria, Tunisia, Libya, Egypt, Sudan, Saudi Arabia, Turkestan and Central Asia.

Adults are small with narrow forewings. They are whitish, dusted with blackish with two paler transverse lines. The hindwings are whitish with a grey margin.

References

Moths described in 1867
samaritanella
Moths of Europe
Moths of Africa
Moths of Asia